In the 1992–93 season, Queens Park Rangers F.C. competed in the inaugural season of the English FA Premier League. They finished the season in 5th place.

Season summary
QPR enjoyed a strong season in the inaugural season of the Premier League, finishing in fifth place - not high enough for UEFA Cup qualification, but still higher than other more fancied sides like Liverpool and Arsenal. Moreover, their high placing ensured that Rangers finished as the top team in London.

Final league table

Results
Queens Park Rangers' score comes first

Legend

FA Premier League

FA Cup

League Cup

Players

First-team squad
Squad at end of season

Left club during season

Notes

References

Queens Park Rangers F.C. seasons
Queens Park Rangers